Astghadzor is a village in the Martuni Municipality of the Gegharkunik Province of Armenia.

Etymology 
The village was previously known as Kats and Katsik, and until 1935, Alikrykh and Alighrkh.

Gallery

References

External links 

 World Gazeteer: Armenia – World-Gazetteer.com
 
 

Populated places in Gegharkunik Province